Charles B. Lanham (December 10, 1898 – May 10, 1971) was an American football player.  A Kentucky native, he played professional football as a tackle for the Louisville Brecks of the National Football League (NFL). He appeared in two NFL games, one each in the 1922 and 1923 seasons.

References

1898 births
1971 deaths
Louisville Brecks players
Players of American football from Kentucky